Elizabeth Messenger (25 July 1908 – 4 January 1965) was a New Zealand journalist, cookery writer and crime novelist. She was born in Thames, Thames/Coromandel, New Zealand on 25 July 1908.

References

1908 births
1965 deaths
People from Thames, New Zealand
20th-century New Zealand women writers
20th-century New Zealand writers